Jim Moore (born 20 May 1938) is an Australian former professional tennis player.

Moore, a Queenslander, made his main draw debut at the Australian Championships in 1959 and made several appearances at the French Championships and Wimbledon from the late 1960s. In addition to tennis he also competed in international tournaments as a squash player. He married tennis player Fay Toyne.

References

External links
 
 

1938 births
Living people
Australian male tennis players
Tennis people from Queensland